Kurt-Yelga (Qortyılğa) is a rural locality (a khutor) in Mrakovsky Selsoviet, Kugarchinsky District, Bashkortostan, Russia. The population was 40 as of 2010. There are 15 streets.

Geography 
Kurt-Yelga is located 4 km east of Mrakovo (the district's administrative centre) by road. Mrakovo is the nearest rural locality.

References 

Rural localities in Kugarchinsky District